Emmanuel Episcopal Church is an historic Episcopal church located on the west side of U.S. Route 301, just north of the Rappahannock River in Port Conway, Virginia, in the United States. Emmanuel Church and its historic graveyard are located in front of Belle Grove. In 1751, future President James Madison was born at Belle Grove, the childhood home of his mother, Eleanor Rose "Nellie" Conway. On January 7, 1987, Emmanuel Church was added to the National Register of Historic Places.

National Register listing
Emmanuel Church ** (added 1987 - Building - #86003593)
Also known as Emmanuel Episcopal Church
US 301, Port Conway
Historic Significance: 	Architecture/Engineering
Architect, builder, or engineer: 	Niernsee & Neilson
Architectural Style: 	Gothic Revival
Area of Significance: 	Architecture
Period of Significance: 	1850-1874
Owner: 	Private
Historic Function: 	Religion
Historic Sub-function: 	Religious Structure
Current Function: 	Religion
Current Sub-function: 	Religious Structure

Current usage
Emmanuel Church is still in use and is one of three churches that form the Hanover-with-Brunswick Parish of the Episcopal Diocese of Virginia. The rector of the parish is the Rev. Diane Carroll. Services are held twice a month at Emmanuel.

See also

 Emmanuel Episcopal Church (disambiguation)
 National Register of Historic Places listings in King George County, Virginia

Gallery

References

External links

 Hanover-with-Brunswick Parish official website.
 List of Burials in Emmanuel Church Cemetery
 St. Paul's Episcopal Church history - discusses Emmanuel Church
 Video of the church and cemetery

Churches completed in 1860
19th-century Episcopal church buildings
Churches on the National Register of Historic Places in Virginia
Episcopal churches in Virginia
Gothic Revival church buildings in Virginia
Churches in King George County, Virginia
National Register of Historic Places in King George County, Virginia